Brachyclados is a small genus of South American plants in the tribe Mutisieae tribe within the family Asteraceae.

 Species
 Brachyclados caespitosus (Phil.) Speg. - southern Argentina (Chubut + Santa Cruz)
 Brachyclados lycioides D.Don - Chile (Coquimbo), Argentina (Chubut, Rio Negro, La Pampa, Buenos Aires, Mendoza, Neuquén, San Luis)
 Brachyclados megalanthus Speg. - Argentina (Chubut, Rio Negro, La Pampa, Buenos Aires)
 formerly included
see Trichocline 
 Brachyclados stuckertii - Trichocline plicata

References

External links

Mutisieae
Asteraceae genera